Amorim is a Portuguese surname. A habitational name from any of the various places named Amorim, originally (villa) Amorini, from the name of the estate owner.

There is a Hispanicized version, Amorín.

It may refer to:

People 
Américo Amorim (1934–2017), Portuguese businessman
Ana Amorim (born 1983), Brazilian handball player
Celso Amorim (born 1942), Brazilian diplomat and politician
Eduarda Amorim, (born 1986), Brazilian handball player
Enrique Amorim (1900–1960), Uruguayan novelist and writer
José Amorín Batlle (born 1954), Uruguayan lawyer and politician
Ni Amorim (Nuno Amorim, born 1962), Portuguese racing car driver
Patrícia Amorim (born 1969), Brazilian swimmer
Rúben Amorim (born 1985), Portuguese footballer

See also 
Amorim, Póvoa de Varzim, a suburb in Portugal
Corticeira Amorim, a Portuguese cork company

Portuguese-language surnames